The genus Brachypodius is a small genus of songbirds in the bulbul family, Pycnonotidae.

Taxonomy
The genus Brachypodius was introduced in 1845 by the English zoologist Edward Blyth to accommodate the black-headed bulbul. The word Brachypodius combines the Ancient Greek brakhus meaning "short" with pous, podos meaning "foot".

A molecular phylogenetic study of the bulbul family published in 2017 found that Pycnonotus was polyphyletic. In the revision to create monophyletic genera Brachypodius was resurrected to contain four species that were previously placed in Pycnonotus.

The genus contains four species:

 Grey-headed bulbul (Brachypodius priocephalus)
 Black-headed bulbul (Brachypodius melanocephalos)
 Andaman bulbul (Brachypodius fuscoflavescens)
 Blue-wattled bulbul (Brachypodius nieuwenhuisii)

References

Brachypodius
Taxa named by Edward Blyth